O. R. "Rick" Minton Jr. (born January 1, 1950)  previously served as a Representative in the House of Representatives of the U.S. state of Florida. He currently lives in Fort Pierce, Florida with his family.

Education
He received his bachelor's degree & Master's degree from the University of Florida.

References

External links

Official Website of Rick Minton

University of Florida alumni
Members of the Florida House of Representatives
1950 births
Living people